Ben Oliver is a British comics artist.

Ben Oliver may also refer to:

Ben Oliver (athlete), English athlete and Cornwall county record holder for the 100m and 400m Wheelchair racing
Ben Oliver (cricketer), Australian cricketer
Ben Oliver (criminal), English criminal and first person to have a televised sentencing hearing in England